Luncavița is a commune in Caraș-Severin County, western Romania with a population of 2,944 people. It is composed of two villages, Luncavița and Verendin (Verend).

References

Communes in Caraș-Severin County
Localities in Romanian Banat
Place names of Slavic origin in Romania